The Madrid Charter: In Defense of Freedom and Democracy in the Iberosphere (Spanish: Carta de Madrid: en defensa de la libertad y la democracia en la Iberosfera), also known as the Letter from Madrid, was a manifesto created on 26 October 2020 by the Disenso Foundation think tank of the far-right Spanish political party Vox. The document denounced left-wing organizations in Ibero-America, says these groups pose a threat to liberal democracy through communism, and that part of the region "is held hostage by totalitarian regimes of communist inspiration, supported by drug trafficking and third countries, all of them under the umbrella of Cuba". The Madrid Charter was primarily signed by anti-communist, conservative, far-right, and right-libertarian politicians from the Americas and the Iberian Peninsula.

Background 
The Madrid Charter was a manifesto created as part of an effort to create the Madrid Forum, an anti-communist international organization with a "permanent structure and an annual action plan". Vox initially introduced the project to the government of United States president Donald Trump while visiting the United States in February 2019, with Santiago Abascal using his good relations with the administration to build support within the Republican Party and establishing strong ties with American contacts. In March 2019, Abascal tweeted an image of himself wearing a morion similar to a conquistador, with ABC writing in an article detailing the document that this event provided a narrative that "symbolizes in part the expansionist mood of Vox and its ideology far from Spain". The charter subsequently grew to include signers that had little to no relation to Latin America and Spanish-speaking areas.

The Madrid Forum was destined to hold its first event in Madrid in June 2020, though it was cancelled due to the COVID-19 pandemic, with the Madrid Charter converting into an online document presented on 26 October 2020 instead.

Content 
In the document, signatories define two entities; the first is an allied "Iberosphere" of nations holding the same roots to the Iberian Peninsula and the second are left-wing groups such as the São Paulo Forum and the Puebla Group, which the charter recognizes as an enemy and threat to the freedom. The letter condemns leftist groups as being under the influence of Cuba, stating that they are "under the umbrella of the Cuban regime", describes part of the region as being "kidnapped by totalitarian communist-inspired regimes, supported by drug trafficking" and says that leftist groups hold an "ideological agenda" to destabilize liberal governments. The letter also highlights respect for the rule of law, separation of powers, and private property. It also called for scholars, the media, and other groups to uphold the objectives of the Madrid Charter.

Promotion 
Delegates of Vox travelled throughout Latin America to promote and obtain signatures the manifesto, meeting with politicians in Ecuador, Mexico, and Peru. While promoting the charter in Ecuador, Vox delegate Hermann Tertsch said that signatures were necessary to counter "narcosocialism", arguing that "[a]ll Latin American countries are threatened by the same totalitarian project funded mainly by Venezuelan oil and drug trafficking", which Tertsch said was guided by Cuba.

In Mexico, the visit and signature collection event by Vox caused controversy when the National Action Party (PAN) legislators signed the charter. PAN politicians received criticism on social media that resulted with conflicts within the party. Shortly after participating with Vox, PAN politicians distanced themselves from signing the manifesto, while the party's official Twitter deleted an image of PAN members meeting with Vox representatives. Due to Vox's controversial visit, discussions occurred of Mexico possibly enforcing Article 33 of the Constitution of Mexico, which grants the expulsion of foreign individuals for interfering in Mexican "political affairs". Andrés Manuel López Obrador, the president of Mexico, declined this option by stating: "Mexico is a free country. I also say this so that if the gentleman of Vox, Abascal, wants to come again, he can do it. The doors of our country are open, they are always welcome. All foreigners, even if they are opponents."

Peruvian investigative journalism website OjoPúblico wrote in an article discussing far-right alliances in the Americas that members of Vox travelled to Peru to obtain signatures, with the parties Go on Country of Hernando de Soto, Popular Force of Keiko Fujimori, and Popular Renewal of Rafael López Aliaga signing the document. Peruvian business executives, including the owner of Willax Televisión, also participated in discussions and signed the charter. Additionally, Vox created an e-participation initiative in Peru to gather signatures from Peruvian citizens.

Signatories

Analysis 
According to the centre-left Spanish newspaper El País, the Spanish political party Vox, which it describes as being far right, organized groups of Evangelicals, Catholics, neoconservatives, right-wing populists, and individuals "nostalgic for military dictatorships" with the Madrid Charter. The Committee for the Abolition of Illegitimate Debt described the charter and Madrid Forum as "a first attempt to regroup the forces of the hard right" into a "Brown International", noting that the Madrid Charter is "co-signed by parties and personalities of the extreme right that have nothing to do with Latin America or with the Spanish language." Página 12, a Kirchnerist newspaper edited in Buenos Aires, described the initiative as a "cultural war" declared by Vox and "a conservative offensive on what democratic advances that had or have began in Latin America at the beginning of this century". Political scientist Kathy Zegarra of the Pontifical Catholic University of Peru discussed Keiko Fujimori's participation with Vox's initiative, stating: "It's beneficial for the far-right public. However, it generates liabilities especially for those citizens who have more tolerant ideas; ... it is negative for those citizens who have more progressive values, who have values in favor of human rights." Khemvirg Puente, political scientist of the National Autonomous University of Mexico, said that the participation of PAN politicians in the charter was a way for Mexican president Andrés Manuel López Obrador to confirm his rhetoric against the party and that this act moved the party to the far right, making it unattractive to voters.

See also 

 Conservative Manifesto

References

External links 
 Carta de Madrid: en defensa de la libertad y la democracia en la Iberosfera – Fundación Disenso

Anti-communism
Documents
Far-right politics
Far-right politics in Europe
Far-right politics in South America
Ibero-America
Latin America
Politics of Cuba
Politics of Peru
Politics of South America
Politics of Spain
Politics of Venezuela
Right-wing politics
Right-wing populism
Vox (political party)